The softball competition at the 2014 Central American and Caribbean Games was held in Veracruz, Mexico.

The tournament was scheduled to be held from 16–30 November at the Carlos Cerdan Arechavaleta Sports Unit.

Medal summary

Medal table

References

External links
Official Website

2014 Central American and Caribbean Games events
2014 in softball
Central American and Caribbean Games
International softball competitions hosted by Mexico